Gary Waddell is an Australian actor. He was nominated for the 2012 AACTA Award for Best Actor in a Supporting Role for his role in The King is Dead! and for an AFI award for his role in 1975 film Pure Shit.

Filmography

Television
Old School (2014) TV series - Ken (1 episode)
Killing Time (2011) TV series - Anthony Farrell (1 episode)
City Homicide (2011) TV series - Bruno Lilley (1 episode)
Rake (2010–16) TV series - Epis / Harley (3 episodes)
A Model Daughter: The Killing of Caroline Byrne (2009) TV movie - Mick Bruvette
Scorched (2008) TV movie - Nick
Home and Away (2007–09) TV series - Terry Mitchell (4 episodes)
Chandon Pictures (2007) TV series - Dean (2 episodes)
Joanne Lees: Murder in the Outback (2007) TV movie - Vince
Two Twisted (2006) TV mini series - Jimmy Kitchen (1 episode)
Bad Cop, Bad Cop (2002) TV series - Steve McClure (2 episodes)
All Saints (2001) TV series - Macca (1 episode)
SeaChange (2011) TV series - Foreman (2 episodes)
Stingers (1998 - 2004) TV series - Gerry Gallagher / Frank Mornain (2 episodes)
Blue Heelers (1998) TV series - Mike Thompson (1 episode)
Water Rats (1996 - 2000) TV series - Billy Pope / Tom Haxby (3 episodes)
Cody: The Tipoff (1994) TV movie - Mack
Heartland (1994) TV mini series - Lennie
Seven Deadly Sins (1993) TV mini series - (1 episode)
G.P. (1992–94) TV series - Wayne / Rocco (2 episodes)
E Street (1992) TV series - Bill O'Reilly (1 episode)
True Believers (1988) TV mini series - (2 episodes)
The Facts of Life Down Under (1987) TV movie - Hugo
The Blue Lightning (1986) TV movie - Hennessey
Scales of Justice (1983) TV mini series - Jimmy (1 episode)
Cop Shop (1978) TV series - Harry Dunne (1 episode)
Bluey (1977) TV series - Terry Baxter / Davidson  (2 episodes)

Films

 The Survival of Kindness (2022)
The Stranger – WA Head
The Tail Job (2016) - The Wharfie
Charlie's Country (2013) - Gaz
The King is Dead! (2012) - King
Almost (2007) - Charlie
The Proposition (2005) - Officer Davenport
Man-Thing (2005) - Cajun Pilot
Lennie Cahill Shoots Through (2003) - Terry
Gettin' Square (2003) - Dennis Obst
Dirty Deeds (2002) - Freddie
Black and White (2002) - Constable Jones
Chopper (2000) - Kevin Darcy
Maslin Beach (1997) - Ben
Heaven's Burning (1997) - Motel Manager
Dr. Ice (1996) - Newscaster
Shotgun Wedding (1993) - Nighclub spruiker
Prey of the Chameleon (1992) - Newscaster
Sweet Talker (1991) - Bluey
Breaking Loose (1988) - Cop
Grievous Bodily Harm (1988) - Eddie Weaks
Monkey Grip (1982) - Actor 3
The Highest Honor (1982) - Cpl. R.B. Fletcher
Heatwave (1982) - Florist messenger
Stir (1980) - Dave
In Search of Anna (1978) - Maxie
Blue Fire Lady (1977) - Charlie
The FJ Holden (1977) - Deadlegs
Oz (1976) - Guitarist / Bikie
Pure Shit (1975) - Lou

References

External links
 
Biographical cuttings on Gary Waddell, actor, containing one or more cuttings from newspapers or journals held at the National Library of Australia

Australian male film actors
Living people
1952 births
People from Carlton, Victoria
Male actors from Melbourne